Mariza Corrêa (1 December 1945 – 27 December 2016) was a Brazilian anthropologist and sociologist. She was professor at the Department of Anthropology of the State University of Campinas (Unicamp).

Trained in journalism in the Federal University of Rio Grande do Sul (1969), she started to study social sciences in the State University of Campinas where she graduated in 1975. She earned in 1982 her PhD in Political Sciences at the University of São Paulo with a thesis on Raimundo Nina Rodrigues.

Between 1996 and 1998, she was president of the Associação Brasileira de Antropologia.

References 

1945 births
2016 deaths
State University of Campinas alumni
University of São Paulo alumni
Federal University of Rio Grande do Sul alumni
Brazilian anthropologists
Brazilian women anthropologists
20th-century Brazilian women writers
21st-century Brazilian women writers
21st-century Brazilian writers
Brazilian non-fiction writers
Academic staff of the State University of Campinas
21st-century women scientists
Brazilian women academics